The 2020 Vancouver Titans season was the second season of Vancouver Titans's existence in the Overwatch League. The team entered the season as the defending Pacific Conference (previously titled Pacific Division) champions looking to bounce back after their 2019 Grand Finals loss to the San Francisco Shock. The Titans planned to host two homestand weekends in the 2020 season at the Rogers Arena in Downtown Vancouver, but all homestand events were canceled due to the COVID-19 pandemic.

On April 30, the Titans parted ways with head coach Hwang "paJion" Ji-sub. Vancouver released its entire roster and coaching staff on May 6. Two days later, the Titans announced the hiring of Steven "Flubby" Coronel and revealed their new roster. The team struggled throughout the season, amassing a 6–15 regular season record. A 0–3 loss to the Washington Justice in the North America play-in tournament on September 3 ended the team's season.

Preceding offseason

Roster changes 
The Titans enter the new season with no free agents, two players which they have the option to retain for another year, and eight players under contract. The OWL's deadline to exercise a team option is November 11, after which any players not retained will become a free agent. Free agency officially began on October 7.

Acquisitions 
On November 26, it was announced that main tank Baek "Fissure" Chan-hyung had come out of retirement and signed with the Titans. A day later, Vancouver announced the signing of veteran support player Ryu "ryujehong" Je-hong.

Departures 
The Titan's first offseason roster change was on November 12, when the team released tank Hwang "TiZi" Jang-hyeon. Two days later, the team announced the departure of flex support Kim "Rapel" Jung-geun. On November 18, the team parted ways with DPS Lee "Hooreg" Dong-eun, as he looked to begin a coaching career in professional Overwatch. The following week, Vancouver released main tank Park "Bumper" Sang-beom.

Roster

Transactions 
Transactions of/for players on the roster during the 2020 regular season:
On April 30, the Titans released tank Choi "JJANU" Hyeon-woo.
On May 6, the Titans released DPS Kim "Haksal" Hyo-jong, DPS Seo "SeoMinSoo" Min-soo, DPS Lee "Stitch" Chung-hee, tank Baek "Fissure" Chan-hyung, tank Lee "Twilight" Joo-seok, support Ryu "ryujehong" Je-hong, and support Kim "SLIME" Sung-jun.
On May 8, the Titans signed support Carson "CarCar" First, DPS Dalton "Dalton" Bennyhoff, tank Abtin "ShRedLock" Shirvani, support Randal "Roolf" Stark, DPS Samir "Tsuna" Ikram, and tank Alhumaidi "KSAA" Alruwaili.
On May 22, the Titans signed DPS Niclas "SHockWave" Jensen.

Standings

Game log

Regular season

Midseason tournaments 

| style="text-align:center;" | Bonus wins awarded: 0

Postseason

References 

Vancouver Titans
Vancouver Titans
Vancouver Titans seasons